Diaethria candrena, the candrena eighty-eight or number eighty, is a species of butterfly of the family Nymphalidae. It is found in Argentina and Brazil.

The wingspan is 40–46 mm. The forewings are black with a deep blue basal flush. The hindwings are mostly black, again with a deep blue basal flush. The underside of the forewing is mostly red with a broad black border. The underside of the hindwing is mostly white with a thin black outer margin and two thin black concentric bands bordering a distinct "80" design on the centre of the wing, hence one of the common names.

The larvae feed on Celtis species.

Subspecies
Listed alphabetically:
Diaethria candrena candrena (Argentina, Brazil (Rio Grande do Sul))
Diaethria candrena longfieldae (Talbot, 1928) (Brazil (Mato Grosso))

References

External links
 Diaethria candrena, Fauna Paraguay

Biblidinae
Butterflies described in 1824
Fauna of Brazil
Nymphalidae of South America